In music, Op. 32 stands for Opus number 32. Compositions that are assigned this number include:

 Arensky – Piano Trio No. 1
 Barber – Vanessa
 Beach – Gaelic Symphony
 Britten – Festival Te Deum
 Chopin – Nocturnes, Op. 32
 Dvořák – Moravian Duets
 Elgar – Imperial March
 Holst – The Planets
 Klebe – Die Ermordung Cäsars
 Marcy – Gaelic Symphony
 Mendelssohn – Die schöne Melusine
 Nielsen – Chaconne
 Rachmaninoff – Preludes, Op. 32
 Schubert – Die Forelle
 Schumann – 4 Klavierstücke (Scherzo, Gigue, Romance and Fughette)
 Sibelius – The Origin of Fire
 Sinding – Frühlingsrauschen
 Sinigaglia – Le baruffe chiozzotte
 Tchaikovsky – Francesca da Rimini